Laura Hughes (born 6 June 2001) is an Australian soccer player who plays for Canberra United in the W-League.

Career

Hughes was born in Canberra, and was signed in 2016 from the Canberra academy, and also had played some games for the Junior Matildas. She made her debut on 18 December 2016, as a substitute in Canberra's 5–1 victory. This was her only appearance for the year.

In the 2018–19 season, Hughes played a more regular role for Canberra which culminated with her winning the club's rising star for the year.

She scored her first goal in a 3–1 victory over Adelaide at the end of the 2019–20 season.

Hughes briefly left Canberra to play for Þróttur in Iceland but shortly re-signed for Canberra United in time for the 2020–21 W-League. Hughes had created a video of highlights of her playing which had been sent to various Icelandic clubs, this then led to her being noticed by Nik Chamberlain, the manager of Þróttur at the time. Hughes had always intended her stay in Iceland to be short-term as, when asked about her plans for the following Australian summer, she responded with "I am planning to return to Australia in time for W-League. However, it depends on whether the new coach of Canberra United would like to offer me a spot in their squad."

Personal life

She has studied at Erindale College.

References

External links 
 

2001 births
Living people
Australian women's soccer players
Canberra United FC players
Soccer players from the Australian Capital Territory
A-League Women players
Australian expatriate sportspeople in Iceland
Expatriate women's footballers in Iceland
Women's association footballers not categorized by position
21st-century Australian women
Australian expatriate women's soccer players
Sportspeople from Canberra